Shan Xiaona (born 18 January 1983 in Anshan, Liaoning, China) is a Chinese-born naturalised German table tennis player. She represented Germany at the 2016 Summer Olympics. She won the silver medal in the women's team table tennis competition.

Singles titles

References

External links
 

1983 births
Living people
German female table tennis players
Olympic table tennis players of Germany
Table tennis players at the 2016 Summer Olympics
Table tennis players at the 2020 Summer Olympics
Olympic medalists in table tennis
Olympic silver medalists for Germany
Medalists at the 2016 Summer Olympics
Chinese emigrants to Germany
Table tennis players from Liaoning
Naturalised table tennis players
Table tennis players at the 2015 European Games
Table tennis players at the 2019 European Games
European Games medalists in table tennis
European Games gold medalists for Germany
World Table Tennis Championships medalists